This is a list of electoral results for the electoral district of Caulfield East in Victorian state elections.

Members for Caulfield East

Election Results

Elections in the 1950s

References

Victoria (Australia) state electoral results by district